Tommy Freeman (January 22, 1904 – February 20, 1986) was an  American professional boxer who became a World Welterweight Boxing Champion on September 5, 1930, when he defeated reigning champion Young Jack Thompson.  He lost the title to Thompson the following year, on April 14, 1931.  Remarkably, the majority of his recorded wins were by knockout, and his losses were few, at under ten percent of his total fights.

He was rated by The Ring magazine as a Top Ten Welterweight contender from 1926-1931. His impressive win and extraordinary knockout record might be explained by the limited quality of competition he faced in Hot Springs where he fought many of his fights.

Boxing career highlights
Freeman's amateur boxing career began around the age of sixteen in Hot Springs, Arkansas.  Between 1920-22, he lost only two of twenty of his better publicized local bouts and won six by knockout.  He fought most of these bouts in the lightweight to super-lightweight division.

Around 1923, at 19, he began fighting in the Welterweight division, and often out of state in Memphis, Tennessee, and parts of New Orleans.  His few losses during this period were often to heavier or more experienced boxers, and included Al Monroe, Dude Martinez, and Frankie Jones.  His loss to Jimmy King in January 1923 was a rare TKO, in which Freeman sprained his hip and was very reluctant to have his manager call the fight.

He achieved some early recognition on New Years Day in 1926, when he knocked out Sergeant Sammy Baker in seven rounds at Madison Square Garden.

On October 25, 1926, Freeman fought a well attended match against Jack Zivic of Pittsburgh in Cleveland, Ohio.  Both fighters were recognized as leading contenders for the Welterweight title then held by Pete Latzo. The bout was a thrilling spectacle and the substantial crowd of twelve thousand loudly opposed the draw verdict as they favored the local boxer Zivic.

On June 22, 1926, Freeman defeated Pinky Mitchell in Brooklyn, Ohio, in ten rounds by Newspaper Decision of the Associated Press.  Mitchell had held the Light Welterweight (Super Lightweight) Championship from 1922-26 when he was defeated by Mushy Callahan. Freeman weighed in over the required weight and the fight, originally scheduled for the Jr. Welterweight title, became a non title fight.

On August 18, 1927, Freeman beat noted British boxer Harry Mason in a ten round welterweight bout at Madison Square Garden.  Mason had a neat right-hand that countered Freeman, but he could not match him in close quarters. Mason was well known in London where he had taken the British Lightweight Championship, known as the Lonsdale Belt in February 1926.  Mason, a Jewish boxer, had been a stablemate of Jewish welterweight champion Jack "Kid" Berg under trainer Alec Goodman.

Freeman defeated Jewish welterweight contender Georgie Levine in a ten round points decision on October 14, 1929, at Motor Square Garden in Pittsburgh.  Now a rising star, Freeman boxed elegantly conserving his energy to last the full ten rounds, and slipped most of the punches of Levine while landing his own with accuracy. He appeared to fight without dealing unnecessary punishment to Levine, whom he easily outpointed.

Taking world welterweight championship, September 1930
On September 5, 1930, at Cleveland Ball Park in Cleveland, Ohio, Freeman defeated Young Jack Thompson, the reigning Welterweight Champion in front of a crowd of 16,000.  The well-known and widely respected referee Patsy Haley, a former New York boxer, crowned Freeman the winner after fifteen rounds of close fighting, shocking the crowd as well as both boxers. In the second round, Thompson had floored Freeman for a count of six. According to the referee, the victory was given to Freeman based largely on his performance in the last three rounds when he connected with far more punches than Thompson. The championship bout was Thompson's first title defense.

Losing the world welterweight championship, April, 1931
Freeman held the title until his rematch with Jack Thompson on April 14, 1931, again in Cleveland, where he lost by TKO in the tenth of fifteen rounds.  The bout was stopped due to Freeman's badly battered left eye.

He had a long career as a boxer, and remained fighting as a super welterweight until around 1937.  He fought for a year as a middleweight from 1937-8.  Best known of his middleweight opponents was Al McCoy, whom he fought on July 2 and 16, 1937, in Pine Bluff, Arkansas.

He died on February 20, 1986, in Little Rock, Arkansas, at 82, an advanced age for a lifelong boxer.

Professional boxing record
All information in this section is derived from BoxRec, unless otherwise stated.

Official record

All newspaper decisions are officially regarded as “no decision” bouts and are not counted in the win/loss/draw column.

Unofficial record

Record with the inclusion of newspaper decisions in the win/loss/draw column.

References

External links
 

|-

 

 https://titlehistories.com/boxing/na/usa/ny/nysac-wl.html

1904 births
1986 deaths
Boxers from Arkansas
Welterweight boxers
American male boxers
World welterweight boxing champions